Poul-Erik Høyer Larsen (born 20 September 1965) is the current President of the Badminton World Federation and a retired Danish badminton player who won major international singles titles in the 1990s, and ranks among Denmark's badminton greats.	In 2014, Høyer became a member of the International Olympic Committee (IOC), he has been a board member of the Danish Olympic Committee since 2005.

Badminton career
Høyer Larsen competed in three Summer Olympics. In Barcelona 1992, he was defeated in quarterfinals by Ardy Wiranata. In Atlanta 1996, he won the gold medal in the men's singles after beating Dong Jiong in the final. In 2000 Summer Olympics in Sydney, he lost in the opening round.

He also won two All-England Open Badminton Championships in 1995 and 1996, and the European Badminton Championships in 1992, 1994 and 1996.

Høyer became President of Badminton Europe in 2010. In February 2007, he was nominated Vice-President of the Danmarks Badminton Forbund. On 18 May 2013, Høyer was elected President of the Badminton World Federation.

Achievements

Olympic Games 
Men's singles

World Championships 
Men's singles

World Cup 
Men's singles

European Championships 
Men's singles

IBF World Grand Prix (19 titles, 17 runners-up) 
The World Badminton Grand Prix sanctioned by International Badminton Federation (IBF) from 1983 to 2006.

Men's singles

References

External links 
 
 Poul-Erik Høyer's Profile - Badminton.dk
 

1965 births
Living people
Danish male badminton players
Olympic badminton players of Denmark
Badminton players at the 1992 Summer Olympics
Badminton players at the 1996 Summer Olympics
Badminton players at the 2000 Summer Olympics
Olympic gold medalists for Denmark
Olympic medalists in badminton
People from Gribskov Municipality
World No. 1 badminton players
International Olympic Committee members
Medalists at the 1996 Summer Olympics
Badminton executives and administrators
Sportspeople from the Capital Region of Denmark